Matwani is a village in Moga district, Punjab, North-West India.  It is important in the history of Sikhism, as there is a Gurudwara Sahib in the village associated with the sixth Sikh Guru, Shri Guru Har Gobind Ji.

The village is mainly populated by members of the Korotana sran subgroup of Jatts.

External links
http://moga.nic.in/html/village.html

Villages in Moga district